Józef Cebula (23 March 1902 – 9 May 1941) was a Polish priest of the Missionary Oblates of Mary Immaculate (OMI).

Born on 23 March 1902 into a modest family in Malnia, Poland, Joseph Cebula was the eldest of three children. He suffered tuberculosis as a youth and was declared incurable at first; but after his recovery, he went to an Oblate shrine and shared his story with Father Jan Pawolik.  Pawolik suggested he study at the minor seminary at Krotoszyn. Cebula completed his secondary studies there. In 1921 he began his novitiate at Markowice. He studied philosophy in Liege, Belgium, and finished his theological studies at Lubliniec.

He was ordained as a priest on 5 June 1927 while still in a seminary.  Father Cebula became a superior at the Oblate seminaries in 1931, and became novice master at Markowice in 1937.

Two years later, when the Germans occupied Poland, they declared loyalty to the Church illegal. In October 1939 the 100 member community at Markowice was placed under house arrest, and set to work as farm laborers. On 4 May 1940, the Oblate novices at Markowice were sent to the concentration camp at Dachau in Upper Bavaria, Germany.  However, Father Cebula continued to minister as a priest in secret despite the ban on it. After being denounced for administering the sacraments to the sick he was arrested by the SS on April 2, 1941 and sent to the camp at Inowroclaw. On April 7, he was taken to a concentration camp at Mauthausen in Austria and was harassed and forced to hard labor. On 9 May, Father Cebula suddenly summoned up his strength and said, "It is not you who are in charge. God will judge you." The Nazis ordered him to run with a rock on his back, towards the camp's barbed wire fence, where a guard shot him to death with a submachine gun and declared that Father Cebula "was shot while trying to escape".  His body was taken to a crematorium and burned to ashes.

He was beatified by Pope John Paul II on 13 June 1999 as one of the 108 Martyrs of World War II.

References

External links 
Blessed Józef Cebula's profile from the website of The Missionary Oblates of Mary Immaculate
Blessed Józef Cebula's profile from The Black Cordelias' website

1902 births
1941 deaths
108 Blessed Polish Martyrs
20th-century Polish Roman Catholic priests
20th-century venerated Christians
Roman Catholic missionaries in Poland
Polish civilians killed in World War II
People who died in Mauthausen concentration camp
Polish Roman Catholic missionaries
People from Krapkowice County
Polish people executed in Nazi concentration camps
Executed Polish people
People executed by Germany by firearm
Catholic saints and blesseds of the Nazi era
Executed people from Opole Voivodeship
Missionary Oblates of Mary Immaculate